Neko Harbour is an inlet of the Antarctic Peninsula on Andvord Bay, situated on the west coast of Graham Land.

Neko Harbour was discovered by Belgian explorer Adrien de Gerlache during the early 20th century.  It was named for a Scottish whaling boat, the Neko, which operated in the area between 1911 and 1924.

Capitán Fliess Refuge
Captain Fliess Refuge is an Argentine refuge in Antarctica located in Neko Harbour in the Andvord Bay on the Danco Coast, west side of the Antarctic Peninsula. The refuge was opened on April 4, 1949 and it is managed by the Argentine Navy. It was inaugurated together with the Penguin Observatory and the Rescue Station under the name of Refugio Neko. 
His name pays tribute to the Lieutenant of the ship Felipe Fliess of the Corvette Uruguay who rescued the Swedish Antarctic Expedition headed by Otto Nordenskjöld.

It has been enabled and supplied by the icebreaker ARA Almirante Irízar and the ship ARA Bahía Aguirre in various Antarctic campaigns.
The refuge was destroyed by a storm in 2009, was then rebuilt in 2011 during the 2011-2012 Antarctic summer campaign. Maintenance, repair and conservation of facilities were carried out to be used as support for scientific research.

Important Bird Area (IBA)
Neko Harbour has been classified as an important bird and biodiversity area by BirdLife International because it supports a breeding colony of more than 250 breeding pairs of gentoo penguins that nest on the hill near the beach to avoid risk of being washed away by the large waves frequently generated from the calving of the nearby glacier. Southern giant petrels and south polar skuas also nest here. The area has been also used by Weddell seals, which frequently haul out to rest.

See also
 List of Antarctic field camps

References

External links

Secretariat of the Antarctic Treaty Visitor Guidelines and peninsula description
Tourism and the history of Antarctica Tourism
 , United States Environmental Protection Agency
Antarctica, Jeff Rubin (Lonely Planet), pp. 223
Lonely Planet episode on Neko Harbor 
Images of Neko Harbor By Rutgers University, NJ, USA.

Ports and harbours of Graham Land
Danco Coast